Alitho Saradaga was an Indian Telugu-language television talk show hosted by Ali and produced by Gnapika Entertainments. The show was primarily broadcast on ETV. The show was premiered on the television on 24 October 2016. Kadiyala Praveena is the primary producer of the show. It was one of the popular and the longest-running talk-shows of Indian television. It was ended on 19 December 2022.

Episodes

2016

2017

2018

2019

2020

2021

2022

Home media 
The show is primarily broadcast on ETV every Monday. It is also available on ''etvteluguindia'' YouTube channel. The show is available on ETV WIN, a mobile app launched by ETV Network where all of its content is available.

Notes

References

External links 
 

Indian television talk shows
2016 Indian television series debuts
Telugu-language television shows
ETV Telugu original programming
2022 Indian television series endings